Shahrizal bin Mohd Saad (born 5 June 1987) is a Malaysian professional footballer who plays for Hanelang in the Malaysia FAM League as a forward.

Career
Shahrizal started his career at Perak FA and he also played for the Perak President Cup team at the youth level. He was one of the players in the Perak President Cup who win the competition in 2007. Scoring 12 goals, he was the second top scorer in the team behind Razali Umar Kandasamy.

He played for Johor FC in 2012 and Felda United in 2013, before rejoining Perak for the 2014 season.
In 2015, he player for Negeri Sembilan FA in the Malaysia Premier League.

National team
He made his debut for the Malaysia national football team, when he entered the friendly match against Hong Kong national football team as a late substitute for Safee Sali, on 9 February 2011.

Personal life
Shahrizal is the older brother of Shahrul Saad who is currently playing for Harimau Muda A and previously Harimau Muda B. They also have another brother who is the former Perak FA and Terengganu FA player, Syamsul Saad.

References

External links
 Shahrizal Bin Mohd Saad Biography Seladang.Net
 

1987 births
Living people
Malaysian footballers
Malaysia international footballers
People from Perak
Perak F.C. players
Johor Darul Ta'zim F.C. players
Felda United F.C. players
Perlis FA players
Negeri Sembilan FA players
Malaysia Super League players
Association football forwards